Henry Rosenberg (born Henry von Rosenberg; 1824–1893) is the namesake of Rosenberg, Texas. He was born in Bilten, Switzerland, on June 22, 1824 and died in Galveston, Texas on May 12, 1893. As a business leader and philanthropist, he founded or led several important businesses in the Galveston area. He had no children and left more than $600,000 ($16 million in 2020 dollars) to create a free public library in Galveston, Texas.

Source of name for Rosenberg, Texas 
The City of Rosenberg is located at the site of a junction of two rail lines, named Rosenberg Junction (named after Mr. Rosenberg). Rosenberg was involved in the building of one of the major rail lines. in his role as president of the Gulf, Colorado and Santa Fe Railway. Rosenberg was the first president of the company.

References 

American company founders
19th-century Swiss businesspeople
Rosenberg, Texas
1824 births
1893 deaths
19th-century American businesspeople